Athletics contests were held at the 2015 Parapan American Games from August 10 to 14 at the CIBC Athletics Stadium in Toronto, Canada.

Schedule
All times are Central Standard Time (UTC-6).

Medal table
Brazil won the most medals while the hosts, Canada, were third with a total of 43 medals.

Medalists

Men's events

Women's events

See also
Athletics at the 2015 Pan American Games

References

 
Events at the 2015 Parapan American Games
2015
Parapan American Games